NOS/VE (Network Operating System / Virtual Environment) is a discontinued operating system with time-sharing capabilities, written by Control Data Corporation in the 1980s. It is a virtual memory operating system, employing the 64-bit virtual mode of the CDC Cyber 180 series computers. NOS/VE replaced the earlier NOS and NOS/BE operating systems of the 1970s.

Commands
The command shell interface for NOS/VE is called the System Command Language, or SCL for short. In order to be callable from SCL, command programs must declare their parameters; this permits automatic usage summaries, passing of parameters by name or by position, and type checking on the parameter values. All standard NOS/VE commands further follow a particular naming convention, where the form of the command is  verb{_adjective}_noun; these commands could be abbreviated with the first three characters of the verb followed by the first character(s) of all further words. Examples:

Inspired by addressing structure-members in various programming languages, the catalog separator is the dot.

Subsystems like FTP integrate into the command shell.  They change the prompt and add commands like get_file.  Thereby statements like flow-control stay the same and subsystems can be mixed in procedures (scripts).

Parameters
Commands could take parameters such as the create_connection command:
crec telnet sd='10.1.2.3'
would connect you to IP address 10.1.2.3 with telnet service.

See also
NOS
CDC Kronos
NOS/BE

External links
User's Guide for NOS/VE on the CDC Cyber 960
Computer history - NOS/VE (Most of this information was extracted from a CDC NOS/VE information leaflet)
NOS/VE Operating System
NOS/VE Command Language Syntax
List of NOS/VE Commands
NOS/VE Utilities

Control Data Corporation operating systems
Discontinued operating systems
Time-sharing operating systems